= BlameitonG =

BlameitonG, also known as Gregory Wings, is an American hip hop artist, music promoter and entrepreneur based in South Africa.

== Career ==
He founded his first real estate company in 2002 called Metropolitan Realty & Construction then Metro Brokers in 2005. ln 2015 he established HVAC and a construction company called Blue Screen Construction.

In 2007, BlameitonG faced legal troubles leading to a 122-month sentence in federal prison in 2007 with significant financial consequences of $8.5 million in restitution, and the federal government seized $19.5 million from his earnings. He was released in 2014. In 2019, he survived a shooting during an attempted robbery in Los Angeles.

In 2023, BlameitonG co-founded an entertainment company called Ternary Media Group with his former Nigerian business partner, Sedote Nwachukwu. Through this company, they organized a Burna Boy concert in Johannesburg, South Africa, scheduled for September 23, 2023. However, the show was cancelled, because of dispute between BlameitonG and Sedote Nwachukwu who was accused of fraud during the planning of the event.

== Discography ==
=== Albums ===
- Too Many Secrets 2022

=== Singles ===
- Sunday Morning
- Actions Without Consequences
- Accession
- Coffee Friends
- Conquest
- Beautifulest
